Judge Duffy may refer to:

F. Ryan Duffy (1888–1979), judge of the United States Court of Appeals for the Seventh Circuit 
Kevin Duffy (1933–2020), judge of the United States District Court for the Southern District of New York
Patrick Michael Duffy (born 1943), judge of the United States District Court for the District of South Carolina

See also
William S. Duffey Jr. (born 1952), judge of the United States District Court for the Northern District of Georgia